Kunzea dactylota is a flowering plant in the myrtle family, Myrtaceae and is endemic to a small area of New South Wales. It is a spreading shrub with small, finger-shaped leaves and clusters of white flowers near the end of the branches. It grows at high altitudes on the Southern Tablelands of the state.

Description
The flowers are arranged in rounded heads of about seven to ten near the ends of the branches which often continue to grow during flowering. Flowering occurs between November and January.

Taxonomy and naming
Kunzea dactylota was first formally described in 2016 by Hellmut R. Toelken from a specimen collected in the Tinderry Range and the description was published in Journal of the Adelaide Botanic Garden. The specific epithet (dactylota) is derived from the Ancient Greek word daktylos meaning "finger", referring to the finger-like appearance of the leaves of this species.

Distribution and habitat
This kunzea grows in rocky places in heath with Tingiringi gum (Eucalyptus glaucescens) and snow gum (Eucalyptus pauciflora), mostly in the Tinderry Range.

References

dactylota
Flora of New South Wales
Myrtales of Australia
Plants described in 2016
Endemic flora of Australia
Taxa named by Hellmut R. Toelken